Fyrde is a village in Volda Municipality in Møre og Romsdal county, Norway. The village is located at the end of the Austefjorden branch of the main Voldsfjorden. The new European route E39 highway runs past the village of Fyrde.

Austefjord Church is located in Fyrde.

References

Villages in Møre og Romsdal
Volda